Adam McLean (born 7 March 1948 in Glasgow) is a Scottish writer on alchemical texts and symbolism. In 1978 he founded the Hermetic Journal which he published until 1992 during which time he also started publishing the Magnum Opus Hermetic Sourceworks, a series of 55 editions (to 2018) of key source texts of the hermetic tradition. From 2004 he began collecting tarot cards in order to document tarot art and built up a collection of 2500 items. In 2016 he set up the Surrealism Website in order to document surrealist painters. This currently shows the work of 100 surrealist artists. He also created a series of 20 video lectures on many facets of surrealist paintings. In 2017 he set up an art gallery The Studio and Gallery in Kilbirnie in North Ayrshire in order to promote the work of emergent and lesser-known artists.

Career
McLean developed an interest in alchemy in his youth which has continued throughout his life. Located in Glasgow, McLean accessed the wealth of alchemical texts located in The Ferguson Collection in Glasgow University Library, the Young Collection also in Glasgow, and the John Read Collection at University of St Andrews. From 1990 to 2002  McLean’s work was supported through the Bibliotheca Philosophica Hermetica.

Aside from his prolific writing and publishing efforts, McLean has contributed to the study of alchemy through the collecting, cataloguing and archiving of alchemical texts; the creation of alchemical art and study courses; and the establishment of web resources that bridge the interests of scholars and esotericists.

Influence
Since the early 1980s, Adam McLean has been credited as a pioneer in the resurgence of English language alchemical texts, creating a huge expansion in interest at both a scholarly and popular level. In 1995, he founded The Alchemy Website, greatly increasing the availability of alchemical texts and art for a general audience. John Granger named McLean as one of the three figureheads of modern alchemical influence alongside Carl Jung and Titus Burckhardt.

Bibliography

References

External links
 The Alchemy Website

Surrealism website

British writers
Living people
1948 births